Amppipal is a small village in the municipality Palungtar of the Gorkha District of Nepal. This village is in minutes from Ligligkot which is assumed to be the origin of unification of Nepal.
 

This village contains a hospital originally operated by United Mission to Nepal, built in 1969. Now it is supported by  Nepalmed e.V., a German NGO in Grimma.

Amp-pipal is well known for local market and primitive cultural activities. It is on the top of the hill which is well-centered to neighboring villages. This market has been serving local from ages. It is located next to Shree Janata Secondary School and Amp-pipal hospital. During the beginning of the Monsoon season, it celebrates locally widely popular Dance festival called “Lakhe Nach”. “Lakhe Nach” is part of the Newari culture which gathers a large crowd all the time. This festival is the most watch Dance festival in this region.  Amp-pipal also celebrates other Nepali festival such as; Teej, Dashain and Tihar in a large crowd. There are some illegal Gambling and liquor shop around the corner. Some liquor shop might have homemade alcohol. The homemade alcohol known as “Teen Pane” also the must test alcohol for foreigner. In a clear day, one can able to see so many exquisite mountains and stunning scenery around the Amp-pipal. The historically famous Ligligkot is also in a walking distance from here.

References

Populated places in Gorkha District